The Wingate Baronetcy, of Dunbar in the County of Haddington and of Port Sudan, was a title in the Baronetage of the United Kingdom. It was created on 6 July 1920 for General Sir Reginald Wingate. He was succeeded by his son, the second Baronet. He was a colonial administrator. The title became extinct on his death in 1978.

Wingate baronets, of Dunbar and Port Sudan (1920)
Sir (Francis) Reginald Wingate, 1st Baronet (1861–1953)
Sir Ronald Evelyn Leslie Wingate, 2nd Baronet (1889–1978)

References

Extinct baronetcies in the Baronetage of the United Kingdom